Oriental Beat is the second studio album by the Finnish glam punk band Hanoi Rocks, recorded in London and released in 1982. Oriental Beat also opened markets in the UK and Japan, where Hanoi eventually became very popular.

Background

Recordings for Oriental Beat (then with the working-title, Second Attempt for Suicide) started in late 1981, at the Advision-studio in London. The album was produced, recorded and mixed by Peter Wooliscroft who had worked with Frank Zappa for example. This album also marked the first time McCoy was not the sole songwriter, with Monroe being the second songwriter on the songs "Motorvatin'" and "Teenangels Outsiders". Many of the lyrics deal with typical rock n' roll topics like breaking the law ("No Law or Order) and teenage rebellion ("Teenangels Outsiders"). The album features backing vocals by Katrina Leskanich, the lead singer of Katrina and the Waves. There's also a legend that originally Nasty Suicide sang the song "Devil Woman", but when asked about it Suicide replied: "you know too much".

The previous album, Bangkok Shocks, Saigon Shakes, Hanoi Rocks, was only released in Finland and Sweden, but this album opened the doors to an international career. British music magazine Kerrang! released their first article about Hanoi Rocks, when they reviewed Oriental Beat. Kerrang! since covered Hanoi Rocks career in the 80's extensively.

Cover art

The artwork features the band covered in paint behind a glass panel with blue and red paint-pressed hand marks on it. The artwork was originally supposed to feature guitarist Andy McCoy's girlfriend's naked breasts painted blue and red with the legend "Hanoi Roxx" written across it. This was changed due to Castle Records' view that some record shops may refuse to stock the album due to the graphic nature of the cover. The record company was also worried that potential customers may get confused by the alternate spelling of the band's name. The original cover was used as the album's back cover.

Re-mix

Over the years, Hanoi Rocks members have stated their dissatisfaction with the mixing of Oriental Beat. The original multitrack recordings of the album were found in 2020 after being lost for over 30 years and a newly mixed version, labeled Oriental Beat - 40th Anniversary Re(al)mix, will be released on March 17, 2023.

Reception

Even though Oriental Beat is considered a Hanoi classic, many of the band members have called the album a failure. Michael Monroe has called the album great, but blamed the producer, Pete Wooliscroft, of ruining the album's sound with all-around bad producing and mixing, claiming that Wooliscroft had mixed the album while Hanoi Rocks was on tour, didn't know what Hanoi Rocks was about, and had mixed it without understanding the band's aesthetic. Sami Yaffa called the album "a piece of shit" in a 1985 interview. Even with these comments, the album was voted the 91st best rock album in the "100 Greatest Rock Albums" poll by the Finnish radio station Radio Rock. Oriental Beat beat out such albums as Kiss' Lick It Up and The Doors' Morrison Hotel. The song "Fallen Star" features in the episode titled "Monkey Dory" of the 2022 TV-series Peacemaker.

Track listing

Personnel
Hanoi Rocks
Michael Monroe – vocals, saxophone, harmonica
Andy McCoy – guitar, backing vocals
Nasty Suicide – guitars, backing vocals
Sam Yaffa – bass
Gyp Casino – drums
Additional personnel
Katrina Leskanich - backing vocals on "Don't Follow Me"

Production
Producer: Pete Wooliscroft
Mixing: Pete Wooliscroft
Mastering: Pete Wooliscroft

Chart positions

Album

References

Hanoi Rocks albums
1982 albums